Carlos Ernesto Cisneros Barajas (born 30 August 1993), also known as El Charal, is a Mexican professional footballer who plays as a right-back and winger for Liga MX club Guadalajara.

Club career

Youth career
Cisneros joined Guadalajara's youth academy in 2008. He then continued through Chivas Youth Academy successfully going through U-17 and U-20. Until reaching the first team, Benjamín Galindo being the coach who promoted Cisneros to first team.

Coras (loan)
Cisneros joined Coras F.C. on loan. He made his debut on July 18, 2014, against Zacatepec winning 1–0.

Guadalajara
He made his professional debut as a substitute on 17 February 2013 in a match against Puebla that resulted in a 1–1 draw. He scored his first goal on 24 January 2016 in a home match against Tigres UANL.

Honours
Guadalajara
Liga MX: Clausura 2017
Copa MX: Apertura 2015, Clausura 2017
Supercopa MX: 2016
CONCACAF Champions League: 2018

Mexico U23
Pan American Silver Medal: 2015

References

External links
 
  at Chivas Campeon
 
 
 

1993 births
Living people
Footballers from Guadalajara, Jalisco
Association football wingers
Mexican footballers
Footballers at the 2015 Pan American Games
Footballers at the 2016 Summer Olympics
Olympic footballers of Mexico
Pan American Games medalists in football
Pan American Games silver medalists for Mexico
C.D. Guadalajara footballers
Coras de Nayarit F.C. footballers
Deportivo Toluca F.C. players
Liga MX players
Medalists at the 2015 Pan American Games